Planck usually refers to Max Planck (1858–1947), a German physicist considered to be the founder of quantum theory.

Planck may also refer to:

Science

Astronomy
 Planck (crater)
 Planck (spacecraft)

Cosmology
 Planck units

People with the surname
 Amalia Planck (1834–1908), Swedish entrepreneur
 Erwin Planck (1893–1945), German politician and resistance fighter
 Gottlieb Jakob Planck (1751–1833), German theologian and historian and grandfather of Max Planck
 Karl Christian Planck (1819–1880), German philosopher
 Nina Planck (born 1971), American food writer

See also
 Max Planck Society, for the Advancement of Science
 Plank (disambiguation)